Dear Mom is a 2014 Taiwanese television series produced by Sanlih E-Television. Starring Ling Hung, Joanne Tseng, Albee Huang, Beatrice Fang, Shiou Chieh Kai, Melvin Sia, Duncan Chow and Jack Lee as the main cast. The Chinese title literally translates to "My Four Precious Daughters", which is in reference to the four main female characters of the drama. Filming began on December 1, 2014 and will be filmed as the drama aired. First original broadcast began December 16, 2014 on SETTV channel airing weekly from Monday till Friday at 8:00-9:00 pm.

Synopsis
The Li family have four precious daughters. Each is different in their own way.
Eldest An Qing (Ling Hung) is the perfect daughter to everyone, excelling academically and successful. She lives in the US with her young son and husband, but when she returns to Taiwan she hides from her family that she has been recently divorced. 
Second daughter Yi Wan (Joanne Tseng), is obedient to her parents and kind to others. Simpleminded and a bit of a klutz, but she never worries her parents. She works as a kindergarten teacher. 
Third daughter Qing Qing (Albee Huang) is a workaholic, who at times is over confident of herself. She is the personal secretary to the CEO of a trading company. Her unbalance work/personal life makes her mother worry that she will never have time to date or find a steady boyfriend. 
Then there is fourth and youngest daughter Xiao Xi (Beatrice Fang). She is a University student who is spoiled by dad and lives a carefree life.
The four Li sisters pursue life and love differently from each other.

Cast

Main cast
Main cast is played by (The Li's Daughters ) and (Four Others Boys).

The Li's Daughter 
Ling Hung 洪小鈴 as Li An Qing 黎安晴 Eldest Daughters ( Da Jie)
Joanne Tseng 曾之喬 as Li Yi Wan 黎一彎Second Daughters (Er Jie)
Albee Huang 小薰 as Li Qing Qing 黎清清 Third Daughters (San Jie)
Beatrice Fang 方志友 as Li Xiao Xi 黎小溪 Younger Daughters ( Xiao Jie)

Four Others Boys
4 others boys later become couples with each The Li's daughters=
Shiou Chieh Kai 修杰楷 as Chen Qi Le 陳其樂 ( later Li An Qing 's lover)
Melvin Sia 謝佳見 as Du Xiao Fei 杜曉飛 ( later Li Yi Wan 's lover)
Duncan Chow 黎登勤 as Xu Ji Kuan 徐季寬 
Jack Lee 李運慶 Zhao Yu Hang 趙宇航 (later Li Xiao Xi 's lover)

Supporting cast
Lu Hsueh Feng 呂雪鳳 as Xu Feng Yi 許鳳儀 (The Li's daughter's mother)
Chen Bor-jeng 陳博正 as Li Shu Guang 黎曙光 (The Li's daughter's father)
Elten Ting 丁也恬 as Chen Tian Jiao 陳甜嬌 (Du Xiao Fei 's mother)
Yang Ming Wei 楊銘威 as Xiao Guo Qin 蕭國欽 (Du Xiao Fei 's Bodyguard)
Li Fang Wen 李芳雯 as Li Mei En 黎美恩 (The Li's daughter's aunt) 
Yan Yi Ping 顏怡平 as Momoko Lin Chun Tao 林春桃 (The Li's daughter's only cousin)
Ye Hui Zhi 葉蕙芝 as 園長 Principal (Li Yi Wan 's Boss)
Zhu You Cheng 朱宥丞 as Jerry Sun Yi Xing 孫亦星  (Li An Qing 's son)
Stanley Mei 梅賢治 as Long Long 龍龍 (Li Yi Wan's friend or Kindergarten Teacher)
Garfield Chung 鍾政均 as Que Shan Ming 闕山明 (Li Qing Qing's worker friend)
Jerry Lan 蘭競恆 as Daniel ( Chen Qi Le's Worker)
Ariel Ann as Chen Qi Pei 陳其霈 (Chen Qi Le 's younger sister)
Jean Wang as Chen Qi Ren (Chen Qi Le's and Chen Qi Pei's older Sister)
Jean Lee as Xu Hui Qi (Xu Ji Kuan's wife)

Cameo role
Xiao Liang Ge 小亮哥 as Hei Mao 黑毛
Wu Zhen Ya 吳震亞 as Motorcycle shop owner 機車行老闆
Chen Jian An 陳建安 as Reporter 記者
Yorke Sun 孫沁岳 as Kuo Xi Ming
 Aaron Yan as Shika
Jeanine Yang as Yun Wei
Wasir Chou as Wasir Ding
Amanda Liu as Xue Lian

Soundtrack

Dear Mom Original TV Soundtrack (OST) (我的寶貝四千金 電視原聲帶 ) was released on February 6, 2015 by various artists under Universal Music (TW) record label. It contains 10 tracks total, in which 3 tracks are various alternatives versions of the original songs. The opening theme is track 1 "Roller Coaster 雲霄飛車 " by Dawen, while the closing theme is track 2 "Lonely Light 寂寞之光" by Rachel Liang.

Track listing

Songs not featured on the official soundtrack album.
Small World 小世界 by Shiny 姚亦晴
Amnesia Goldfish 失憶的金魚 by Rainie Yang 楊丞琳
In Fact, We Deserve Happiness 其實我們值得幸福 by Rainie Yang 楊丞琳

Development and casting
On November 20, 2014, the four main female cast members (Ling Hung, Joanne Tseng, Albee Huang, and Beatrice Fang) where introduced at a press conference held at Sanlih's headquarters main lobby.
On November 27, 2014, the four main male cast members (Shiou Chieh Kai, Melvin Sia, Duncan Lai, and Jack Lee) where introduced at a press conference held at Sanlih's headquarters rooftop garden.
The entire extended cast was introduced at a press conference held at Sanlih's headquarters auditorium on December 15, 2014.

Broadcast

Episode ratings

Awards and nominations

References

External links
Dear Mom SETTV Website  
Dear Mom ETTV Website  

Eastern Television original programming
2014 Taiwanese television series debuts
2015 Taiwanese television series endings
Sanlih E-Television original programming
Taiwanese romance television series